Jan Lochbihler (born 3 March 1992) is a Swiss sports shooter. He competed in the men's 50 metre rifle three positions event at the 2016 Summer Olympics.

References

External links
 
 

1992 births
Living people
Swiss male sport shooters
Olympic shooters of Switzerland
Shooters at the 2016 Summer Olympics
Shooters at the 2010 Summer Youth Olympics
ISSF rifle shooters
Shooters at the 2015 European Games
Shooters at the 2019 European Games
European Games medalists in shooting
European Games gold medalists for Switzerland
21st-century Swiss people